The 1957 NFL season was the 38th regular season of the National Football League. The season ended with the Detroit Lions defeating the Cleveland Browns in the NFL championship game, 59–14.

Draft
The 1957 NFL Draft was held on November 26, 1956, and January 31, 1957, at Philadelphia's Warwick Hotel and The Bellevue-Stratford Hotel. With the first pick, the Green Bay Packers selected halfback Paul Hornung from the University of Notre Dame.

Major rule changes
During sudden-death overtime, rules for time outs are the same as in a regular game, including the last two minutes of the second and fourth quarters.
Home teams wore dark jerseys and road team wore white. Previously, NFL teams were allowed to wear whatever uniform color they liked, even if it clashed with the other team, and were not required to have a white jersey.

Conference races
Cleveland won its opener, 6–3 over the Giants, and led the Eastern Conference from wire to wire.  A 17–7 loss to the Eagles in Week Four forced the Browns to share the lead with New York, but the Giants lost the following week, and spent the rest of the season trying to catch Cleveland.

The Western Conference race was more protracted. Baltimore, Detroit, and San Francisco were tied for the lead several times, and had identical 7–4 records at the end of the penultimate week. When two teams tied for first place, they would meet in a one-game playoff. The NFL did have a provision for this situation: "If all three teams win, tie, or lose, then a two-week playoff series begins next Sunday with Baltimore drawing a bye, San Francisco playing Detroit, and the winner meeting the Colts at Baltimore December 29." Detroit and San Francisco both won while starting their backup quarterbacks (Tobin Rote and rookie John Brodie, respectively), but the Colts lost, meaning the additional playoff was not required.

Final standings

Playoffs

Home team in capitals
Western Conference Playoff Game
Detroit 31, SAN FRANCISCO 27
NFL Championship Game
DETROIT 59, Cleveland 14

Awards

Coaching changes
Detroit Lions: Buddy Parker was replaced by George Wilson.
Pittsburgh Steelers: Walt Kiesling was replaced by Buddy Parker.

Stadium changes
The Green Bay Packers moved from City Stadium to New City Stadium

References

 NFL Record and Fact Book
 NFL History 1951–1960 (Last accessed December 4, 2005)
 Total Football: The Official Encyclopedia of the National Football League

National Football League seasons